Arundel is a town in southern England.

Arundel may also refer to:

Locations and districts

United Kingdom
 Arundel (UK Parliament constituency), a UK Parliament constituency between 1974 and 1997, serving the abovementioned town of Arundel, West Sussex
 Arundel and South Downs (UK Parliament constituency) (from 1997)
 Arundel (Liverpool ward), an electoral district of the Liverpool City Council

United States
 Arundel, Maine 
 Anne Arundel County, Maryland
 Arundel Mills, a mall in Anne Arundel County
 Arundel Preserve, a mixed-use development near Arundel Mills
 Kennebunkport, Maine, named Arundel from the 1700s until 1821

Elsewhere
 Arundel, New Zealand
 Arundel, Quebec, Canada
 Arundel, Queensland, Australia, a suburb of the Gold Coast
 Arundel Island, Solomon Islands

People
 Earls of Arundel, an earldom in England
 Joe Arundel, professional rugby league footballer
 Thomas Arundel (1353–1414), Archbishop of Canterbury
 Thomas Arundel (disambiguation), other people of that name
 Dohickey Arundel, an American Revolutionary War officer, killed in an assault on Gwynn's Island, Virginia

Arts, entertainment, and media
 Arundel, an 1800 novel by Harriet Lee
 Arundel (novel), a 1929 novel by Kenneth Roberts
 "An Arundel Tomb", a poem by Philip Larkin
 Arundel Manuscripts, a collection of manuscripts in the British Library
 Arundel, the name of the estate that is the main setting of The Penderwicks

Other uses
 Arundel, a passenger train operated by the Maine Central Railroad
 Arundel School, an independent school in Harare, Zimbabwe
 Arundel Society, a society founded in London in 1849 and discontinued in 1897
Arundel Formation, a sedimentary rock formation in the Atlantic coast of the US

See also
 Arundell (disambiguation)